Topical steroid withdrawal, also known as red burning skin and steroid dermatitis, has been reported in people who apply topical steroids for 2 weeks or longer and then discontinue use.  Symptoms affect the skin and include redness, a burning sensation, and itchiness, which may then be followed by peeling.

This condition generally requires the daily application of a topical steroid for more than 2 weeks but sometimes can occur with even less steroid use. It appears to be a specific adverse effect of topical corticosteroid use. People with atopic dermatitis are most at risk.

Treatment involves discontinuing the use of topical steroids, either gradually or suddenly. Counselling and cold compresses may also help. The condition is common, with thousands of people congregating in online communities to support one another throughout the healing process. Many cases have been reported in both adults and children. It was first described in 1979.

Signs and symptoms

Topical steroid addiction (TSA) is characterised by uncontrollable, spreading dermatitis and worsening skin inflammation, which requires a stronger topical steroid to get the same result as the first prescription. This cycle is known as steroid addiction syndrome.  When topical steroid medication is stopped, the skin experiences redness, burning, a deep and uncontrollable itch, scabs, hot skin, swelling, hives and/or oozing for a length of time. This is also called 'red skin syndrome' or 'topical steroid withdrawal' (TSW). After the withdrawal period is over, the atopic dermatitis can cease or is less severe than it was before. Topical steroid addiction has also been reported in the male scrotum area. Other symptoms include nerve pain, insomnia, excessive sweating, anxiety, severe depression, fatigue, eye problems, and frequent infections.

Duration 

The duration of acute topical corticosteroid withdrawal is variable; the skin can take months to years to return to its original condition. The duration of steroid use may influence the recovery factor time, with the patients who used steroids for the longest reporting the slowest recovery.

Cause
To experience this withdrawal, it generally requires the misuse and application of a topical steroid daily for 2 to 4 months, depending on the potency of the topical corticosteroid. In some cases, this has been reported after as little as 2 weeks of use.

Mechanism of action 

Historically, it was believed that cortisol was only produced by the adrenal glands, but research has shown that keratinocytes in human skin also produce cortisol. Prolonged topical steroid (TS) application changes the glucocorticoid receptor (GR) expression pattern on the surface of lymphocytes; a patient experiencing resistance to a TS has a low ratio of GR-α to GR-β. In addition, the erythema characteristic of ‘red skin syndrome’ is due to a release of stored endothelial nitric oxide (NO) and subsequent vasodilation of dermal vessels.

Diagnosis
Diagnosis is based on a rash occurring within weeks of stopping long-term topical steroids. Specific signs include ‘headlight sign’ (redness of the lower part of the face but not the nose or the area around the mouth); ‘red sleeve’ (a rebound eruption stopping abruptly at the lower arms and hands); and ‘elephant wrinkles’ (reduced skin elasticity). 

Differentiating this condition from the skin condition that the steroids were originally used to treat can be difficult. Red, burning skin may be misdiagnosed.

Prevention 
This condition can be avoided by not using steroid creams for periods of time longer than 2 weeks.

Treatment
Treatment involves ceasing all use of topical steroids, either gradually or suddenly. Keeping affected areas dry and disinfected will speed healing. Avoid moisturizer, as any dampness elongates the healing process and encourages bacterial growth. Antihistamines may help for itchiness. Immunosuppressants and light therapy may also help some people. Psychological support is often recommended. At this time, treatment options that have been documented in literature include Tacrolimus, Pimecrolimus, and Dupixent. Some physicians have also seen positive outcomes with oral Doxycycline and/or topical Clindamycin.

Epidemiology
This condition is not rare. Many cases ranging from mild to severe have been reported in both adults and children. One survey of atopic dermatitis patients treated with topical corticosteroids in Japan estimated that approximately 12% of adult patients may appear to be uncontrolled cases, although they are in fact addicted to a topical corticosteroid (TCS). According to a study examining the prevalence and disease burden of atopic dermatitis, 16.5 million adults in the United States have a diagnosis of atopic dermatitis.

History
The first description of the condition occurred in 1979.

A systematic review (meta-analysis) in accordance with evidence-based medicine frameworks and current research standards for clinical decision-making was performed in 2016 and was republished with updates in 2020.

References

External links 

Cutaneous conditions
Drug safety
Corticosteroids